Christopher Drexler (born in Graz on 15 March 1971) is an Austrian politician. A member of the Austrian People's Party (ÖVP), he has been the governor of Styria since 4 July 2022.

1971 births
Austrian People's Party politicians
Living people
Governors of Styria
Politicians from Graz
21st-century Austrian politicians

arz:Christopher Drexler